Urmenetea is a genus of South American plants in the family Asteraceae.

Species
The only known species is Urmenetea atacamensis, native to northern Chile (Antofagasta, Atacama) and northern Argentina (Catamarca, Jujuy, Salta).

References

Flora of South America
Onoserideae
Monotypic Asteraceae genera